This is a list of churches in the Outer Hebrides of Scotland. These islands are also officially known as Na h-Eileanan Siar since the implementation of the Local Government (Gaelic Names) (Scotland) Act 1997.

Since the Reformation the residents of the northern islands (Lewis, Harris, North Uist) have been predominantly Presbyterian, and those of the southern islands (Benbecula, South Uist, Barra) predominantly Roman Catholic. At the time of the 2001 Census, 42% of the population identified themselves as being affiliated with the Church of Scotland, with 13% Roman Catholic and 28% with other Christian churches. Many of this last group belong to the Free Church of Scotland. There are also small Episcopalian congregations in Lewis and Harris.

The eight historic civil parishes of the area, by which this list is ordered, are: Barvas, Stornoway, Uig, Lochs, Harris, North Uist, South Uist and Barra.

Active churches

The council area has an estimated 92 active churches for 26,900 inhabitants, a ratio of one church to every 292 people. This is the lowest anywhere in Scotland or the United Kingdom, partially due to the remoteness of settlements and partly to the proliferation of denominations. An even lower ratio is found on the island of North Uist, where there are 10 churches for only 1,254 inhabitants.

Defunct churches

See also
 Religion in the Outer Hebrides

Citations

References
 Malhotra, R. (1992) Anthropology of Development: Commemoration Volume in Honour of Professor I.P. Singh. New Delhi. Mittal.

External links

Churches in the Outer Hebrides
Na h-Eileanan Siar